Gergei is a comune (municipality) in the Province of South Sardinia in the Italian region Sardinia, located about  north of Cagliari.

Gergei borders the following municipalities: Barumini, Escolca, Gesturi, Isili, Mandas, Serri.

Demographic evolution

References 

Cities and towns in Sardinia